Abdullahi Ibrahim Alhassan (born 3 November 1996), known as Mu'azzam, is a Nigerian professional footballer who plays as a midfielder for Belgian club Beerschot.

Club career

Early career
Alhassan was born in Kano and grew up supporting Nigerian league giants Kano Pillars. He was youth player for F.C. Hearts Academy and the Nigerian U-17 and U-20 youth sides. He formed an effective partnership with Kelechi Iheanacho at the U-17 level, was the joint-top-scorer in the U-17 world-cup qualifiers. He went on to successfully represent the Nigerian U-20 team in 2015.

Wikki Tourists F.C.
In late 2015, after receiving offers from teams in Belgium, England, Sweden and Croatia, Alhassan suffered an injury after trials at HNK Rijeka. After recovering, and seeking to maintain his fitness, midway through the 2015–16 NPFL season he signed a 6-month deal with the Nigeria Professional Football League side Wikki Tourists. He made his league debut in June 2016 against Kano Pillars F.C. in Bauchi. He came on as a second-half substitute to turn the game on its head by scoring two late goals against his hometown club. Already well known as the prodigy dubbed Mu'azzam around his state, the 3–1 upset loss for Pillars did not go down well with the travelling Kano supporters.

Akwa United
At the end of the 2015–16 NPFL season, Alhassan decided to follow mentor-coach Abdu Maikaba from Wikki to Akwa United F.C. as he enjoyed his ongoing development under Maikaba’s tutelage. He immediately became a focal point of his new team's attacks alongside midfield maestro Orji Sylvester Amaechi. Mu'azzam scored his first career hat-trick in April 2017 against Shooting Stars in a 4–2 win in Uyo. He had a total of 10 goals at the halfway point (May 2017) of the season, after which Akwa United negotiated an improved deal with F.C. Heart Academy to make him the highest earning player at the club and joint highest in the league alongside Super Eagles goalkeeper Ikechukwu Ezenwa. Mu'azzam provided the assist to Christian Pyagbara's goal in the 0–1 away win against Kano Pillars in a well rounded performance to rouse Kano fans for a second-straight year. He went on to win the April 2017 League Bloggers Awards for Player of the month alongside his mentor-coach Maikaba.

FK Austria Wien
Alhassan signed on a one-year loan with a three-year extension option with FK Austria Wien on 25 August 2017.

Nacional
In 2018, Alhassan joined Portuguese club Nacional.

Beerschot
In the summer of 2022, Alhassan signed a two-year contract with Beerschot in Belgium.

International career
Alhassan has represented Nigerian youth teams at the U-17 and U-20 level. He was part of the Nigeria at the CAF U-20 Championship 2015. He made four appearances as the Nigerian team went on to win the championship. In May 2017, he was called up to the Nigeria national football team.

Honours
Player of the Month, NPFL League Bloggers Award: April 2017

References

1996 births
Sportspeople from Kano
Living people
Nigerian footballers
Nigeria youth international footballers
Nigeria under-20 international footballers
Nigeria international footballers
Association football midfielders
Wikki Tourists F.C. players
Akwa United F.C. players
FK Austria Wien players
C.D. Nacional players
K Beerschot VA players
Nigeria Professional Football League players
Austrian Football Bundesliga players
Primeira Liga players
Liga Portugal 2 players
Challenger Pro League players
Nigerian expatriate footballers
Expatriate footballers in Austria
Nigerian expatriate sportspeople in Austria
Expatriate footballers in Portugal
Nigerian expatriate sportspeople in Portugal
Expatriate footballers in Belgium
Nigerian expatriate sportspeople in Belgium